Diplomatic relations have existed between the Argentina and the Austria for decades. Both nations are members of the United Nations.

History

In 1864, Argentina and the Austro-Hungarian Empire established diplomatic relations. By the early 20th century, a few migrants from Austria had immigrated to Argentina. In 1921, Argentina donated 5 million Argentine pesos to a devastated Austria which had emerged as an independent nation after World War I. In gratitude, Austria named a street in Vienna (Argentinierstraβe). The majority of Austrian migrants who arrived to Argentina arrived in two great migratory waves during the First and Second World Wars.

In October 1994, Argentine President Carlos Menem became the first Argentine head-of-state to pay a visit to Austria. In December 2000, Argentina limited its relations with Austria with regards to the participation of the Alliance for the Future of Austria party led by Jörg Haider who was known for statements in praise of Nazi policies. In 2006, Argentine President Néstor Kirchner paid a visit to Austria to attend the Fourth Latin America, the Caribbean and the European Union Summit in Vienna. In May 2008, Austrian Chancellor Alfred Gusenbauer paid a visit to Argentina. There have since been numerous visits between leaders of both nations.

In 2018, political consultations were held between leading officials of both nations. In 2019, there is a community of approximately 30,000 Austrians residing in Argentina.

Bilateral relations

Both nations have signed several agreements such as an Agreement on compensation for accidents at work by Austrians working in Argentina (1926); Agreement on film cooperation (1958); Treaty on the conduct of military service for dual citizens (1979); Agreement on economic and industrial cooperation (1979); Agreement on scientific and cultural cooperation (1980); Agreement on the Promotion and Protection of Investments (1992); Air Service Agreement (2008) and an Agreement for the elimination of double taxation in the field of taxes on income and property and for the prevention of tax reduction and avoidance (2019).

Trade
In 2017, trade between both nations totaled US$304 million. Argentina's main exports to Austria include: parts and supplies for the automotive industry, beef, fruit and soybean oils and derivatives. Austria's main exports to Argentina include: machinery and equipment, pharmaceutical products, medical and measuring instruments, orthopedic products and iron and steel products.

Resident diplomatic missions
 Argentina has an embassy in Vienna.
 Austria has an embassy in Buenos Aires.

See also 
 Foreign relations of Argentina 
 Foreign relations of Austria
 Austrian Argentines

References 

 
Austria
Argentina